Springer Farm is a historic home and farm complex located at North Union Township, Fayette County, Pennsylvania. Contributing buildings are the brick farmhouse, brick spring house / smokehouse, and a frame barn.  The house was built about 1817, and is a -story, 14 room, rectangular building on a rubble stone foundation. It measures 65 feet by 35.6 feet and has a center hall plan.

It was added to the National Register of Historic Places in 1982.

References

External links 
 
 

Historic American Buildings Survey in Pennsylvania
Houses on the National Register of Historic Places in Pennsylvania
Houses completed in 1817
Houses in Fayette County, Pennsylvania
National Register of Historic Places in Fayette County, Pennsylvania